Scintilli is the sixth studio album by British electronic music duo Plaid, released 29 September 2011 on Warp Records.

Track listing

Charts

References

External links
 Scintilli at Warp.net
 Scintilli on Discogs

2011 albums
Plaid (band) albums
Ambient techno albums
Warp (record label) albums